Forestville is the name of several places:

Australia
 Forestville, New South Wales, a suburb of Sydney
 Forestville, South Australia, a suburb of Adelaide

Canada
 Forestville, Quebec

United States
 Forestville, California
 Forestville, Connecticut, the southeastern portion of Bristol, Connecticut
 Forestville, Maryland
 Forestville, Michigan
 Forestville, Minnesota
 Forestville, New York
 Forestville, Ohio
 Forestville, Butler County, Pennsylvania, a small village in Butler County, Pennsylvania
 Forestville, Schuylkill County, Pennsylvania, a census-designated place
 Forestville, Jefferson County, Pennsylvania, a former small village in Jefferson County, Pennsylvania
 Forestville, Virginia
 Forestville (town), Wisconsin
 Forestville, Wisconsin, a village
 Forestville Township, Fillmore County, Minnesota